Achttienhoven may refer to several villages in the Netherlands:

 Achttienhoven, South Holland
 Achttienhoven, Utrecht